Calcaronea is a subclass of sea sponges in the class Calcarea. They are Calcarea with the triactines and the basal system of tetractines sagittal (i.e. the rays of the spicule make unequal angles with each other), exceptionally regular. In ontogeny the first spicules to be secreted are diactines. Choanocytes are apinucleate. Calcaronea have amphiblastula larvae

External links 
 
 

 
Sponge subclasses